Muppet Monster Adventure is a platform game for the Sony PlayStation, developed by Magenta Software in 2000, and published by Sony Computer Entertainment in Europe and Midway Home Entertainment in North America.

Plot
Robin the Frog is delighted that he and the Muppets are finally going on a vacation. His hopes are dashed, however, when he learns that rather than Krakatoa or England, their destination is a 'run-down, old castle in the middle of nowhere'. His Uncle Kermit reminds him that they had to accompany Dr. Bunsen Honeydew on this journey to hear the reading of his uncle's will, emphasizing the value of friendship. After becoming frightened of his surroundings and the door of the castle being opened by a mysterious figure, Robin faints.

Robin is awoken by Pepe the King Prawn, Beaker and Dr. Bunsen Honeydew in some sort of underground laboratory. Dr. Bunsen Honeydew explains that the laboratory belonged to his late uncle and that after Robin fainted, the group of Muppets was ambushed and many of them transformed into monsters by the castle's 'evil energy'. In addition, the castle's energy has begun to permeate the nearby village causing it to become twisted and evil. Robin asks what can be done, and Honeydew presents him with a special 'Power Glove' that takes evil from monsters and stores it in a backpack. Informing him that the glove will only work with "the amphibian anatomy," he sends Robin on his way to collect evil energy from the village and try to save the Muppets from being monsters forever.

Robin initially fights his way through the innards and grounds of the Castle von Honeydew itself, facing its corrupt knights and guards, before defeating (and thereby rescuing) Gonzo, who has turned into the vampire "Noseferatu."

Next, Robin ventures into the outskirts of the village nicknamed "The Deadlands" where he encounters villainous pirates and reanimated skeletons. Robin defeats the "Wocka Wocka Wearbear" and transforming him back into Fozzie Bear.

Robin is able to advance to the forests around the village called "Neverleave Forest." After avoiding falling prey to transmogrified hunters and evil pumpkin farmers, Robin must fight his own Uncle Kermit to save him from an eternity as "Ker-Monster" (a spoof of Frankenstein's monster).

Having done this, Robin moves into the river-dwelling and Arab quarters of the village referred to as the "Village of the Darned" before doing away with the fearsome Muck Monster who transforms back into Clifford.

With over half the village now saved and purified, Robin moves into Madness Marsh, a treacherous region of the village which is home to its heavily armed hiking community, as well as ravenous piranha, puffer fish, and hungry crocodiles. Robin dispatches them in short order and comes to face the fearsome "Ghoul-friend of Ker-Monster" (a spoof of Bride of Frankenstein) and initiates her transformation back into Miss Piggy.

Having now gained access to the village's more mountainous regions, Robin battles through what is locally called "The Whatsamatterhorn," defeating all manner of foes including a group of violent monks.

Having saved his friends and believing his journey to be complete, Robin returns to the center of the castle only to find one final enemy awaiting him; Baron Petri von Honeydew himself (who has the appearance of Erik from The Phantom of the Opera). Robin manages to turn the Baron's projectiles against him and finally lays his mad soul to rest. Having achieved all this in such a short space of time, Robin succumbs to another faint.

He is awoken once again by Dr. Bunsen Honeydew. This time however, all the other Muppets are with him and seemingly unchanged. He is also lying in the hallway of the Castle itself, where the butler Chives (the figure who opened the door) has led the group of Muppets. Robin exclaims that he has had the most amazing dream and describes his adventure to all those present, who assure him it was indeed a dream. However, as he and the group ascend the stairs and pass a painting of the late Baron von Honeydew, the painting appears to move and say 'shush' to Robin as the Power Glove suddenly appears on Robin's hand again, indicating his adventure may well have been something more than a dream after all.

Gameplay
The game draws heavily on PlayStation standard platformers of its day, most prominently Spyro (with which it shared a sound designer, Michael Gollom). Other notable inspirations are Crash Bandicoot (Robin's spin attack is identical in execution to Crash's), Croc, and Super Mario 64 (the game's swimming system was described as 'intuitive' and compared favourably with Mario's 'flying underwater' style controls).

Despite some fundamental similarities in controls and platforming setpieces used, the game was praised for the array of context-specific transformations that Robin can perform. Inspired by the transformations the Muppets themselves undergo, Robin is able to use their abilities (by taking on their appearance) once he has collected all four pieces of an amulet bearing the relevant Muppet's face. Noseferatu's amulet grants Robin the power to glide, the Wocka Wocka Werebear's enables him to climb, the Muck Monster's allows him to dive underwater, Ker-monster's permits him to push and pull large blocks, and the amulet bearing the Ghoul-friend of Ker-monster gives him the ability to perform door-smashing karate chops.

The mechanisms by which the game progresses are relatively simplistic. Each level requires a certain amount of 'evil energy' (dropped by enemies and scattered freely around all levels) to open it, and only three may be unlocked before a boss has to be fought. Bosses, however, do not require the collection of evil energy but instead need 'Muppet Tokens', a gaming MacGuffin similar to Super Mario 64'''s Power Stars that resemble a golden block shaped like Kermit's head. Once a set number of these have been collected (some are found scattered around levels while others require the completion of certain minigames), the boss is accessible and can be defeated, opening up the next stage of the game.

Cast

 Jerry Nelson – Robin the Frog
 Steve Whitmire – Kermit the Frog, Beaker, Rizzo the Rat
 Frank Oz – Miss Piggy, Fozzie Bear
 Dave Goelz – Gonzo, Dr. Bunsen Honeydew, Baron Petri von Honeydew, Chives the Butler
 Kevin Clash – Clifford
 Bill Barretta – Pepe the King Prawn, The Swedish Chef

Reception

The game received average reviews according to the review aggregation website GameRankings. GameSpots Scott Steinberg called it 'surprisingly polished and enjoyable', but was unimpressed by the game's sound effects and 'forgettable' soundtrack. Jeremy Conrad of IGN'' disagreed with Steinberg's verdict on the soundtrack, deeming it 'probably the best part of the entire game', but found the gameplay 'isn't really anything we haven't seen before'.

References

External links
 
 
 Muppet Monster Adventure at Muppet Wiki

2000 video games
Midway video games
Halloween video games
Single-player video games
The Muppets video games
Platform games
3D platform games
PlayStation (console) games
PlayStation (console)-only games
Sony Interactive Entertainment games
Video games about amphibians
Video games about pigs
Video games about bears
Video games about mice and rats
Video games scored by Michael Giacchino
Video games developed in the United Kingdom
Works about vacationing
Magenta Software games